Events in the year 1895 in Portugal.

Incumbents
Monarch: Charles I
Prime Minister: Ernesto Hintze Ribeiro

Events
17 November – Portuguese legislative election, 1895

Arts and entertainment

Sports

Births
9 July – Aníbal Milhais, the most decorated Portuguese soldier of World War I (died 1970).

Deaths

7 January – João Crisóstomo de Abreu e Sousa, prime minister (born 1811)

References

 
1890s in Portugal
Portugal
Years of the 19th century in Portugal
Portugal